Tom Fogarty may refer to:
Tom Fogarty (hurler) (born 1951), Roman Catholic priest and hurler
Tom Fogarty (footballer, born 1878) (1878–1922), Australian rules player for University, St Kilda and South Melbourne
Tom Fogarty (footballer, born 1909) (1909–1984), Australian rules player for St Kilda
Thomas J. Fogarty, known as Tom, American surgeon and medical device inventor

See also
Tom Fogerty (1941–1990), American musician best known as the rhythm guitarist for Creedence Clearwater Revival